Başmakçı District is a district of Afyonkarahisar Province of Turkey. Its seat is the town Başmakçı. Its area is 361 km2, and its population is 9,536 (2021).

Composition
There is one municipality in Başmakçı District:
 Başmakçı

There are 14 villages in Başmakçı District:

 Akkeçili
 Akkoyunlu
 Akpınar
 Beltarla
 Çevlik
 Çığrı
 Ekinlik
 Hırkaköy
 Küllüce
 Ovacık
 Sarıköy
 Yaka
 Yassıören
 Yukarıbeltarla

References

External links
 District governor's official web site 

Districts of Afyonkarahisar Province